Vukovići is a village in the municipality of Ravno, Bosnia and Herzegovina. It was formerly part of Trebinje, which is now in the Republika Srpska entity.

Geography
Trebinjska Krajina

Demographics
1991: 6 Serbs (100%)
1981: 7 Serbs (100%)
1971: 25 Serbs (100%)
1961: 32 Serbs (100%)

According to the 2013 census, its population was 4, all Serbs.

References

Populated places in Ravno, Bosnia and Herzegovina